Alex Reece (born Alexander Reece, Barnet, England) is a drum and bass musician. He popularized the use of two-step breaks in drum and bass, and was an influence of the jazzstep sound, a mix of drum and bass and jazz. Reece was one of the musicians in the Metalheadz collective, and has also worked under the pseudonym of Fallen Angels.

Career
Reece began DJing in the late 1980s. In 1992, Jack Smooth offered Reece a trainee studio engineer job, and Reece went on to engineer for Smooth on many of the early Basement Records releases. Reece first tried house (recording with his brother, Oscar, under the name of Exodus), but graduated to drum and bass. Though his preferred genres were acid house and Detroit techno, Reece become known for jungle music in the mid-1990s. 

His initial releases appeared on the Sinister, Creative Wax, and Moving Shadow record labels, but Reece made his name with Goldie's MetalHeadz Records. Single releases "Basic Principles" and "Pulp Fiction" became jungle standards. "Pulp Fiction" was released in 1995 as a single on MetalHeadz (MET H 011) where his surname was incorrectly listed as "Reese" on the first batch. "Pulp Fiction" was also later released on an album by Goldie, again on his MetalHeadz label, preventing Reece from putting it out on his own album So Far on the label, 4th & Broadway. Instead Reece produced a remake of "Pulp Fiction" called "Pulp Friction", released in 1996. The two-step break used in "Pulp Fiction" sparked numerous imitators.

Reece cemented his reputation with additional recordings as Jazz Juice (for Precious Materials), Lunar Funk (for Mo'Wax), and the Original Playboy (for R&S). In early 1995, Reece secured a recording contract when Island Records recruited him for their Quango subsidiary. His debut album, So Far was released in September 1996, but whilst the issue was well received in most circles, the jungle underground – led by Goldie – had practically disowned Reece by that time. His 1996 singles "Feel the Sunshine", "Candles" and "Acid Lab" were released under the Fourth & Broadway banner without real commercial success.

References

External links
 
 
 Alex Reece Social Media Account https://www.instagram.com/reecednbfamilyofficial/

Year of birth missing (living people)
Living people
DJs from London
English drum and bass musicians
English record producers
English audio engineers
Remixers
People from Chipping Barnet
Musicians from Hertfordshire
Electronic dance music DJs
Island Records artists